Patrick Michael "Pat" Dahlheimer (born May 30, 1971, in York, Pennsylvania) is the former bassist for Live and bassist for The Gracious Few. Live have sold over 20 million records, including the 8× platinum album Throwing Copper.

Biography
Pat is a founding member of the band Live and has appeared on all their albums to date. He met his future Live bandmates at middle school in York, Pennsylvania. When vocalist Ed Kowalczyk left the band in 2009, Dahlheimer formed the band The Gracious Few along with Chad Taylor and Chad Gracey of Live and Kevin Martin and Sean Hennesy from the band Candlebox. They released their debut album The Gracious Few in 2010. In 2011, Live announced their intention to record new material and Chris Shinn was brought in as the new lead singer in 2012.

Discography

With Live
all albums to date

With The Gracious Few
 The Gracious Few (2010)

References

External links 

 The Gracious Few (official website)
 Friends of Live (official website)

1971 births
Living people
American rock bass guitarists
American male bass guitarists
Live (band) members
The Gracious Few members
Guitarists from Pennsylvania
21st-century American bass guitarists
20th-century American bass guitarists